The Cochrane River is a river in Canadian provinces of Manitoba and Saskatchewan. Located in the boreal forest of the Canadian Shield, it flows from Wellbelove Bay on the northern end of Wollaston Lake in north-eastern Saskatchewan to the north-east end of Reindeer Lake in Manitoba.

The river flows north then east through a series of lakes (Bannock Lake and Charcoal Lake) in Saskatchewan and then flows in a southerly direction through lakes (Misty Lake and Lac Brochet) in Manitoba before entering Brochet Bay on the north-eastern end of the Manitoba section of Reindeer Lake.

The remote Manitoba community of Lac Brochet is located on Lac Brochet, and Brochet and Barren Lands are near the river's mouth.

See also 
List of rivers of Saskatchewan
List of rivers of Manitoba
Hudson Bay drainage basin

References

External links 

Rivers of Saskatchewan
Rivers of Manitoba
Tributaries of Hudson Bay